is an athletic stadium in Yokohama, Kanagawa, Japan.

It was one of the home stadiums of football club YSCC Yokohama.

References

External links
Official site

1951 establishments in Japan
Sports venues completed in 1951
Sports venues in Yokohama
Athletics (track and field) venues in Japan
Football venues in Japan
YSCC Yokohama